Ioan Popa (22 April 1953 – 3 August 2017) was a Romanian fencer. He competed at the 1976 (team épée) and 1980 Summer Olympics (team and individual épée).

References

1953 births
2017 deaths
Romanian male fencers
Romanian épée fencers
Olympic fencers of Romania
Fencers at the 1976 Summer Olympics
Fencers at the 1980 Summer Olympics
Sportspeople from Bucharest